Whitefish Lake is a lake in the Moira River and Lake Ontario drainage basins on the border between the Cashel portion of Tudor and Cashel, Hastings County and Addington Highlands, Lennox and Addington County in Ontario, Canada.

Only the very western tip of the lake lies in Tudor and Cashel, Hastings County, with the rest in Addington Highlands, Lennox and Addington County.

The primary inflow and outflow is Merrill Creek, flowing in at the north from Little Merrill Lake and out at the west. Merrill Creek flows via Partridge Creek, the Skootamatta River and the Moira River into the Bay of Quinte on Lake Ontario at Belleville.

See also
List of lakes in Ontario

References

Lakes of Hastings County
Lakes of Lennox and Addington County